Sir Thomas Bent  (7 December 1838 – 17 September 1909) was an Australian politician and the 22nd premier of Victoria.

Early life
Bent was born in Penrith, New South Wales the eldest of four sons and two daughters of James Bent, a hotel-keeper. He came to Melbourne with his parents in 1849. He went to school in the Melbourne suburb of Fitzroy, later becoming a market-gardener in East Brighton. In 1861 he became a rate collector for the town council of Brighton, then a fast-growing suburb. He soon began buying and selling land in Brighton, and became a property developer in new areas fairly close by, such as Moorabbin.

He developed a major new subdivision of Bentleigh, later named after himself, on the other side of Nepean Highway opposite Brighton. He was a member of both Brighton and Moorabbin town councils and was Mayor of Brighton nine times.

State politics
In 1871 Bent was elected to the Victorian Legislative Assembly for the district of Brighton, defeating the veteran liberal George Higinbotham "to the amazement of every one". He had no particular party loyalties and first held office in the Service government in 1880. He was Commissioner for Works and Railways in Sir Bryan O'Loghlen's government in 1881–1883, and used this position to extend the railway line from Caulfield to Cheltenham, thus enormously increasing the value of his own property developments. His lifelong reputation for corruption dates from this period. The exposure of Bent's dealings led to the defeat of O'Loghlen's government at the 1883 elections.

After this debacle Bent spent 18 years on the backbench, concentrating on his property dealings. His fortunes suffered a reversal in 1888 when a bad investment in Ringwood caused the collapse of the Thomas Bent Land Co., but he soon recovered and became a leading player in the great Land Boom that reached its climax in 1890. For instance, in 1884 Bent purchased property in Exhibition Street for 1,488 pounds and on the same day resold it for 2,000 pounds. In 1892 he surprised his critics by being elected Speaker as part of a complex political deal. A newspaper asked: "Why is Speaker Bent the first commoner in the land? Because no-one commoner than Bent can be found." There was an element of snobbery in this. Bent was the first Victorian premier with a strong Australian accent, and was held in contempt by the Anglo-Scottish Melbourne establishment.

In the severe crash that followed the boom Bent was almost bankrupted, with debts of 80,000 pounds. He had transferred many of his assets to his wife's name and this saved him from bankruptcy. At the election which followed the fall of James Patterson's government, Bent was defeated at Brighton. His fate was sealed when The Age published letters Bent had written as Railways Minister in 1881, offering MPs railways lines in their electorates in exchange for their votes.

Bent moved with his wife Elizabeth and their two daughters to Port Fairy, where he took up dairy farming. But he had not given up his political ambitions. In 1897 he unsuccessfully stood for Port Fairy, then in 1900 he moved back to Melbourne, and at the November 1900 election he was re-elected for Brighton. He completed his comeback by becoming once again Minister for Railways in William Irvine's conservative government. He was soon up to his old tricks, buying land in Brighton and then approving a tramline from St Kilda to Brighton that led right past his properties.

Despite his reputation, Bent was chosen as the new Liberal leader in Victoria when Irvine quit to go into federal politics in 1904, and thus became premier at the age of 66. By this time Bent had grown very fat and his jovial manner, together with Victoria's gradual recovery from the 1890s depression, gained him renewed popularity. In addition to being premier, Bent had the portfolios of public works and railways. Much legislation was passed relating to improvements in public health, education, old age pensions, and water conservation. At the June 1904 elections he won a comfortable majority, and did so again in 1907. His government favoured more state intervention in the economy than had 19th-century liberal governments, and there was now agreement on the need for high tariffs to protect Victorian industry. His greatest boast was that he restored stability and prosperity to Victoria.

During 1908, however, Bent's government began to disintegrate as a result of conflict between country and city interests—a perennial problem for non-Labor governments in Victoria. A bloc of country members led by John Murray opposed Bent's Land Valuation Bill, and to appease them Bent withdrew the bill and appointed several of Murray's supporters to the ministry. But this antagonised Melbourne Liberals led by William Watt, and in January 1909 the various dissidents united to defeat Bent in the Assembly. Bent resigned and Murray became premier.

Legacy
Bent died on 17 September 1909 at his home in Bay Street, Brighton. He had been made a Knight Commander of the Order of St Michael and St George (KCMG) in 1908. He was given a state funeral and buried in Brighton Cemetery. He was married twice, to Hannah Hall and to Elizabeth Huntley. His estate was valued at ₤35,000, most of it going to his daughter from his second marriage.

A statue of Bent, created by Margaret Baskerville and paid for by public subscription, was erected in 1913 on the Nepean Highway, Brighton. For many years "Tommy Bent's statue" was a well-known Melbourne landmark, which, at the time of the Victorian Football League grand final, would be decorated with a cap and scarf in the colours of the team that won the premiership. In the late 1960s, the statue was regularly defaced by a bucket of usually white paint—perhaps as a New Year's Eve prank. The widening of the highway in the 1970s led to the statue being moved to a less prominent location near Bay Street and its landmark status has been lost.

References

Geoff Browne, A Biographical Register of the Victorian Parliament, 1900–84, Government Printer, Melbourne, 1985
Don Garden, Victoria: A History, Thomas Nelson, Melbourne, 1984
Kathleen Thompson and Geoffrey Serle, A Biographical Register of the Victorian Parliament, 1856–1900, Australian National University Press, Canberra, 1972
 Raymond Wright, A People's Counsel. A History of the Parliament of Victoria, 1856–1990, Oxford University Press, Melbourne, 1992
 Margaret Glass, Thomas Bent- Land Booming Politician. Vict. Hist. Jour. Vol 64 p143-157. (1993)

External links
 Sir Thomas Bent (1838–1909) Gravesite at Brighton General Cemetery (Vic)

1838 births
1909 deaths
Premiers of Victoria
Members of the Victorian Legislative Assembly
Treasurers of Victoria
Speakers of the Victorian Legislative Assembly
19th-century Australian politicians
Politicians from Sydney
Australian Knights Commander of the Order of St Michael and St George
Australian politicians awarded knighthoods
City of Bayside